The Bassette Liégeoise or Bassette is a breed of large bantam chicken from Belgium. Eighteen colour patterns are officially recognised; many of them are rare.

History 

Like the Belgian Bantam, the Bassette Liégeoise derives from the widespread European population of small partridge-coloured bantams which in Flemish were known as Engelse kiekskes, "English bantams". In the nineteenth century there was in the area of Liège, in Wallonia, a variable type of small chicken known by regional name bassette, "little chicken", which was thought to derive from inter-breeding of these bantams with local chicken breeds. It was valued for hatching partridge and pheasant eggs. From about 1917 William Collier of Brussels started to selectively breed these for consistent characteristics and for egg-laying capacity. A breed standard was drawn up in 1930 and was approved in 1932.

The Bassette Liégeoise is distributed both in Flanders and in Wallonia; some are found in France, in Germany and in the Netherlands. Like most Belgian bantam breeds, it is rare and at risk of extinction.

Characteristics 

The comb is single, the earlobes are white, and the beak and legs are slate-blue.

Eighteen colour patterns are officially recognised in Belgium. Quail and silver quail are most often seen; partridge is less common, and the other colours are rare or perhaps extinct.

Use 

The hens are good sitters and good mothers.

References

Bantam chicken breeds
Chicken breeds
Chicken breeds originating in Belgium